Warm Springs is a census-designated place (CDP) in and the county seat of Bath County, Virginia, United States. The population as of the 2010 census was 123. It lies along U.S. Route 220 near the center of the county. Warm Springs includes the historical mill town called Germantown. To the west lies West Warm Springs.

History and geography
The community grew up around the courthouse and the nearby Jefferson Pools. The Bath County Health Department, Sheriff's Department, and other county offices are located adjacent to the courthouse. The Warm Springs Post Office handles mail for the 24484 zip code. Other notable landmarks in Warm Springs are the Bath County Historical Society and the Waterwheel Restaurant, which is located inside of a converted mill. Warm Springs Gallery, located just downhill from the courthouse, specializes in contemporary fine art. Apart from these landmarks, Warm Springs is primarily residential in character, with many renovated inns and historic homes which serve as accommodation for out-of-town visitors. The Cowpasture River to the east across Warm Springs Mountain draws visitors for fishing and kayaking.
 
Bath County is fairly unusual in Virginia in that it contains no incorporated towns. Nearby Hot Springs is perhaps more well-known than Warm Springs, though the two are separated by only a few miles.

Jefferson Pools, Hidden Valley Rock Shelter (44BA31), Homestead Dairy Barns, Oakley Farm, and Three Hills are listed on the National Register of Historic Places.

References

External links 
 "Taking the Waters: 19th Century Mineral Springs: Warm Springs". Claude Moore Health Sciences Library, University of Virginia

Census-designated places in Bath County, Virginia
Hot springs of Virginia
County seats in Virginia
Spa towns in the United States
Census-designated places in Virginia
Bodies of water of Bath County, Virginia